Sam Philp (born 4 August 2001) is an Australian rules footballer who plays for the Carlton Football Club in the Australian Football League (AFL). He was recruited by the Carlton Football Club with the 20th draft pick in the 2019 AFL draft.

Early Football
Philp played junior football for St Mary's Greensborough Football Club in the Yarra Junior Football League. He then played for the Northern Knights for two seasons, winning the Brent Harvey Best and Fairest winner award at the knights. He missed out on selection for the Vic Metro representative team. When he went to the National Combine, Philp starred in the fitness testing event, with a combine-best 20m sprint time of 2.867 seconds, while also achieving top 10 scores in the yo-yo test and standing vertical jump.

AFL career
Philp debuted for Carlton in Round 4 of the 2020 AFL season, where his team beat Essendon by a single point. Philp picked up 5 disposals and 2 tackles. Philp suffered persistent groin and hip injuries that rules him out for the 2021 AFL season.

Statistics
Statistics are correct to the end of the 2020 season 

|- style="background:#EAEAEA"
| scope="row" text-align:center | 2020
| 
| 34 || 2 || 1 || 1 || 8 || 6 || 14 || 1 || 3 || 0.5 || 0.5 || 4.0 || 3.0 || 7.0 || 0.5 || 1.5 
|- style="background:#EAEAEA; font-weight:bold; width:2em"
| scope="row" text-align:center class="sortbottom" colspan=3 | Career
| 2
| 1
| 1
| 8
| 6
| 14
| 1
| 3
| 0.5
| 0.5
| 4.0
| 3.0
| 7.0
| 0.5
| 1.5
|}

References

External links

2001 births
Living people
Australian rules footballers from Melbourne
Carlton Football Club players
Northern Knights players